Joussineau de Tourdonnet is a French noble family. Members of the family use titles as Marquis and Counts, confirmed by Louis XIV in 1680. The family lived in Limousin, and according to the family tradition, the family is originally from Normandie.

A member of the family immigrated to Sweden in 1936 and this branch today forms part of the country's unintroduced nobility.

References

French noble families
Swedish unintroduced nobility